Ram Pratap Singh is an Indian politician and a member of 11th,12th,13th,14th,15th,16th,18th Legislative Assembly of Gaura, Uttar Pradesh of India. He represents the Gaura (Assembly constituency)Gaura constituency of Uttar Pradesh. He is was a member of the Bharatiya Janata Party and Samajwadi Party and currently Independent MLA

Political career
Ram Pratap Singh is,was been a member of the 11th,12th,13th,14th,15th,16th,18th Legislative Assembly of Uttar Pradesh. Since 2017, he has represented the Gaura constituency and is a senior member of Uttar Pradesh Legislative Assembly..

Posts held
Member Of Uttar Pradesh Legislative Assembly From 1991 to 2017 (6 Terms),

Member of Uttar Pradesh Legislative Assembly From 2022 to present (1 Term)

Total 7 terms as Member Of Uttar Pradesh Legislative Assembly

See also
Uttar Pradesh Legislative Assembly

References

Uttar Pradesh MLAs 2017–2022
Bharatiya Janata Party politicians from Uttar Pradesh
Living people
1951 births